is a Japanese web novel written by Kimula and released on Pixiv from August 2018 to November 2020. Kadokawa published the novel in print, with art by Jiroalba, with two volumes released. A manga adaptation, illustrated by Jiro, was serialized on Shogakukan's MangaONE app and Ura Sunday online platform from July 2019 to September 2020.

Media

Novel
The original As the Demon King's Right Hand, I'm Going to Rewrite the Script! web novel, written by Kimula, was posted on Pixiv, with 18 chapters released from August 5, 2018 to November 21, 2020. Kadokawa published it in two print volumes, with art by Jiroalba, released from June 15 to October 15, 2020.

Manga
A manga adaptation, with art by Jiroalba, was serialized on Shogakukan's MangaONE app and Ura Sunday online platform from July 9, 2019 to September 1, 2020. Shogakukan collected its chapters in three tankōbon volumes, released from November 19, 2019, to November 19, 2020.

The manga is licensed for English release in Southeast Asia by Shogakukan Asia.

Volume list

Notes

References

External links
 
 

2020 Japanese novels
Isekai anime and manga
Isekai novels and light novels
Novels first published online
Shogakukan manga
Shōjo manga
Webcomics in print